Owl's Head Park is a public park in Bay Ridge, Brooklyn, New York.

History 
The land that would become Owl's Head Park was first settled by the Canarsee. In the 17th century, Dutch settlers arrived in the area. The first European to claim ownership of the park's land was Teunis Van Pelt. On April 13, 1680, he sold a section of his land to Swaen Janse Van Lowaanen, whose farm on the water, north of what is now known as Bay Ridge Avenue, eventually became the park. The land passed through several more hands before ending up with Henry C. Murphy, who in 1856 built a large mansion on the property, creating a personal estate. Murphy was a state senator best known for writing the legislation that began construction on the Brooklyn Bridge. The famous bill was signed in his mansion at Owl's Head, which was a name he bestowed on the property. The source of the name has been a subject of debate, ranging from the shape of the land, to speculation that owls once lived in a barn on the property, to the fact that stone owls once graced its entrance gate. It seems likely, however, that the name was simply lifted from another property in the area, that of the Van Brunt family, whose land really was shaped like an owl.

Murphy sold the property to Eliphalet Williams Bliss, founder of the E.W. Bliss Company. The park is known to some as "Bliss Park" for this reason. Bliss expanded the property by buying nearby land and added new structures to the estate. These structures included a long driveway, a keeper's lodge, a stable, and an observatory and tower. As early as 1894, Bliss embraced the idea of his property one day becoming a public park. After his death in 1903, his will stipulated that the property be sold to the city for a reduced price, but only if it was to be used as parkland. For various reasons, the city did not buy the property until 1928. These delays caused parts of the property to be lost to other purchasers, including the portion directly along the water, which has been home to a wastewater treatment plant since 1952. Financial limitations and lack of political will also led to the demolition of the property's mansion and observatory tower in 1932. By 1940, the stables were also demolished.

In the following decades, improvements to the park were made by the Parks Department under Robert Moses, including paths, playing fields, benches and restrooms. In the 1960s and 70s, however, the park suffered from decline during the city's fiscal crisis. In the 1990s, Brooklyn's borough president and the city council dedicated significant funds to revamp the park. The original wrought iron gates from Bliss's estate, with his initials on them, were reinstalled at the park's southeastern entrance in 2004.

Features 
Owl's Head Park is located on a glacial moraine and thus has rich soil to support its many trees, including pines, locusts, oaks, maples, corks, beeches, and a tulip poplar. The park's land slopes upward towards the water, providing views across New York harbor to Manhattan, Staten Island, and New Jersey. The sloping terrain of the park also makes it a popular place for sledding in the winter. The park has basketball courts, a playground, spray pool, and dog run, as well as a well-known skate park. The park's basketball courts are named for William D. "Billy" Lake, a local firefighter who lost his life on September 11, 2001. The courts were named in honor of Lake in 2004.

The park often hosts local events, such as Viking Fest, which honors the area's history of Scandinavian immigration, Halloween events, and the city's annual Mulchfest event for Christmas tree disposal. In 2022, Owl's Head Park was the site of the first-ever Gay Ridge Pride, an LGBTQ pride event for all of Southern Brooklyn and the neighborhood's first pride celebration.

References 

Parks in Brooklyn